is a dam in Hiroshima Prefecture, Japan.

Dams in Hiroshima Prefecture
Dams completed in 1935
Ōta River